Arlington Hambright (born January 30, 1996) is an American football guard for the Indianapolis Colts of the National Football League (NFL). He played college football at Colorado.

College career
After graduating Belleville as a no-star recruit, Hambright played his first two years of college football at Garden City Community College. He then transferred to Oklahoma State, where he redshirted a year and had a year cut short due to injury. Hambright played his final season of college at Colorado.

Professional career

Chicago Bears
Hambright was drafted by the Chicago Bears in the seventh round (226th overall) of the 2020 NFL Draft, previously acquired from the Las Vegas Raiders as part of the blockbuster Khalil Mack trade that sent two first round picks (Josh Jacobs and Damon Arnette) to the Raiders. He signed a four-year rookie contract with the team on July 21. He made his NFL debut for Special Teams against the New Orleans Saints in Week 8. He made his first NFL start the following week against the Tennessee Titans.

On August 31, 2021, Hambright was waived by the Bears and re-signed to the practice squad the next day.

New England Patriots
On January 18, 2022, Hambright signed a reserve/future contract with the New England Patriots. He was waived on August 30, 2022.

Indianapolis Colts
On September 1, 2022, Hambright was signed to the Indianapolis Colts practice squad. He signed a reserve/future contract on January 9, 2023.

References

External links
Chicago Bears bio
Colorado Buffaloes bio

1996 births
Living people
American football offensive tackles
Colorado Buffaloes football players
Oklahoma State Cowboys football players
Garden City Broncbusters football players
Players of American football from Michigan
Sportspeople from Ypsilanti, Michigan
Chicago Bears players
New England Patriots players
Indianapolis Colts players